Academia de Talentos is a Portuguese online newspaper, dedicated to youth-level football.

Foundation

In the last few years, some Portuguese players have been in the headlines of newspapers all over the world. Luís Figo and more recently, Cristiano Ronaldo, are two of these. Youth football is growing, and people want to follow it and stay informed about what's new. These are the reasons why "Academia de Talentos" was founded.

At this newspaper, readers can find match reports, interviews with coaches and players, transfers, and many other kinds of articles.

Competitions

"Academia de Talentos" is focused in the coverage of S.L. Benfica, F.C. Porto and Sporting matches. This clubs have teams both at national championships (www.fpf.pt) and regional tournaments (Associação de Futebol de Lisboa e Associação de Futebol do Porto)

National

There are three national championships:

 Under-19
 Under-17
 Under-15

Other tournaments 

"Academia de Talentos" has also followed some of the main Portuguese friendly tournaments at youth-level like Nike Premier Cup, Torneio Ponte de Frielas in Loures and the Taça Cidade dos Campeões at Vila Real de Santo António.

Player articles

Some of the players that have had their careers chronicled at the paper:

 Rabiu Ibrahim
 Carlos Alberto
 Alexandre Pato
 Kerlon

Interviews

Every week, "Academia de Talentos" produces an interview with one famous figure at the football industry. Here are some of main interviews:

 Carlos Queiroz, Portuguese national coach
 Ole Gunnar Solskjær, former Manchester United forward and current Reserve Squad Coach
 Rui Jorge, former Sporting and F.C. Porto left-back and current Belenenses youth-squad coach

Quotations

Since its foundation, since it is a reference in the field of youth football,"Academia de Talentos" has been quoted in many Portuguese websites and forums
 and a special reference by Record (One of the top Portuguese sport's newspaper), sub-director Bernardo Ribeiro.

References

External links
 
 Interview with Carlos Queiroz
 Interview with Solskjaer
 Interview with Rui Jorge
 Interview with Emílio Peixe
 Portuguese Football Association
 Associação de Futebol de Lisboa
 Associação de Futebol do Porto

Mass media in Portugal
European news websites